Max Stephenson (born 7 May 1935) is a former  Australian rules footballer who played with St Kilda in the Victorian Football League (VFL).

As of 20th October 2020 Max feels lucky to be alive. Max also was a police officer and still supports St Kilda.

Notes

External links 

Living people
1935 births
Australian rules footballers from Victoria (Australia)
St Kilda Football Club players